Macmillan Cancer Support is one of the largest British charities and provides specialist health care, information and financial support to people affected by cancer. It also looks at the social, emotional and practical impact cancer can have, and campaigns for better cancer care. Macmillan Cancer Support's goal is to reach and improve the lives of everyone who has cancer in the UK.

History
The charity was founded 1911 as the Society for the Prevention and Relief of Cancer, by Douglas Macmillan following the death of his father from the disease. In 1924, the name was changed to the National Society for Cancer Relief, which it retained until 1989 when it was changed to Cancer Relief Macmillan Fund, later changed again to Macmillan Cancer Relief. From 5 April 2006, Macmillan Cancer Relief became known as Macmillan Cancer Support, as this more accurately describes its role in supporting people who have cancer. It has adapted the principles of being a "source of support" and a "force for change".

As the National Society for Cancer Relief, the organization provided funding to support the work of the Breast Care and Mastectomy Association of Great Britain, which would later become Breast Cancer Care.

MacMillan Cancer Support is one of the 50 largest UK charitable organizations ranked by annual expenditure. It is governed by a Board of Trustees and Executive Management Team.

The charity's head office is based in London. Macmillan Cancer Support merged with cancer information charity Cancerbackup in 2008.

Macmillan works in partnership with other cancer research organisations and is a partner of the National Cancer Research Institute.

Cancer Support 
Macmillan Cancer Support supports local information and support centres, cancer support groups, benefits advisers and cancer support specialists, and can help with practical, medical, financial and emotional support.

Macmillan provides information about cancer through its Information Standard website, free printed and recorded materials, telephone support line and over 170 local cancer information and support services nationwide.

Events 
Macmillan host a series of annual fundraising events, which include running, golf and cycling events. The most notable event is World's Biggest Coffee Morning, which has made £75,000,000 since it began in 1990. Macmillan also hosts other large fundraisers, including Brave the Shave which raises over £4,000,000 each year, as well as Go Sober for October which has raised over £3 million.

Previous controversy over fundraising methods 
Macmillan faced criticism when it placed adverts in Facebook and on Google associating the Ice Bucket Challenge, a viral fundraising activity, with itself. It had been suggested that the aim of the Macmillan marketing campaign was to divert web traffic and subsequently awareness and donations away from smaller charities with whom the challenge had been mostly associated, namely those relating to motor neuron disease and ALS.

Amanda Neylon, the head of digital at Macmillan, said the charity got behind the Ice Bucket Challenge, which asks participants to pour a bucket of iced water on their heads, because it was criticised for being too slow on the uptake for the #nomakeupselfie social media campaign. On missing out on the #nomakeupselfie campaign, Neylon said: "We were too slow – it was a big motivator to be much better the next time an opportunity came along."

In 2016, Macmillan scrapped the head of digital role responsible for the controversial fund raising method mentioned above.

See also 
 Cancer in the United Kingdom

References

External links

 Macmillan Cancer Support website
 Macmillan nurse fact sheet
About Sober for October
Learn Zone – resources and e-learning programmes for professionals and people affected by cancer.

Health charities in the United Kingdom
Cancer organisations based in the United Kingdom
1911 establishments in the United Kingdom
Organizations established in 1911
Palliative care in the United Kingdom